Radiophonic Workshop is a 2014 album of recordings created by the BBC Radiophonic Workshop. It was only available through the Bowers and Wilkins's Society of Sound music subscription service.

Track listing

References

External links

BBC Radiophonic Workshop albums
2014 albums